Lanthanosuchoidea is an extinct superfamily of ankyramorph parareptiles from the middle Pennsylvanian to the middle Guadalupian epoch (Moscovian - Wordian stages) of Europe, North America and Asia. It was named by the Russian paleontologist Ivachnenko in 1980, and it contains two families Acleistorhinidae and Lanthanosuchidae.

Phylogeny 
Lanthanosuchoidea is a node-based taxon defined in 1997 as "the most recent common ancestor of Lanthanosuchus, Lanthaniscus, and Acleistorhinus". The cladogram below follows the topology from a 2011 analysis by Ruta et al.

The cladogram below follows the topology from a 2016 analysis by MacDougall et al.

However, the phylogenetic analysis conducted by Cisneros et al. (2021) did not recover a clade uniting lanthanosuchids and acleistorhinids to the exclusion of all other parareptiles. Instead, acleistorhinids were recovered as the sister group of the clade Procolophonia, while lanthanosuchids were recovered within the procolophonian subgroup Pareiasauromorpha.

References

Procolophonomorphs
Permian reptiles
Prehistoric reptiles of Asia
Prehistoric reptiles of Europe
Prehistoric reptiles of North America